Kati Kui is a village in Birthi Haveli Gram panchayat in Bilhaur Tehsil, Kanpur Nagar district, Uttar Pradesh, India. Its village code is 149915.

References

Villages in Kanpur Nagar district